Eileen Klein is an American politician from the state of Arizona who served as the State Treasurer from 2018 to 2019. A member of the Republican Party, she was appointed to replace Jeff DeWit, who resigned to become the CFO of NASA. Previously, Klein had been a member of the Arizona Board of Regents, serving as that board's president.

Education
Klein graduated from Florida State University and holds a Master of Public Administration from Arizona State University.

Career
Klein served as Chief Operating Officer and vice president for UnitedHealthcare Arizona Physicians IPA. In 2009, Klein became chief of staff for Governor Jan Brewer. Klein became president of the Arizona Board of Regents in 2013.

References

Arizona Republicans
Arizona State University alumni
Florida State University alumni
Living people
State treasurers of Arizona
Women state constitutional officers of Arizona
Women in Arizona politics
Year of birth missing (living people)
21st-century American women politicians
21st-century American politicians